Reaghan may refer to:

Reaghan, County Galway, a townland in County Galway, Ireland
Reaghan, County Tyrone, a townland in County Tyrone, Northern Ireland